Torsten Gowitzke (born 8 January 1967) is a German football manager and former player.

Gowitzke plays nowadays for the over-40 team of SFC Stern 1900.

References

External links 
 

1967 births
Living people
German footballers
Bundesliga players
2. Bundesliga players
Association football midfielders
Hertha BSC players
Hertha BSC II players
German football managers